Alec Ross (1881–1952) was a Scottish golfer.

Alec Ross may also refer to:

 Alec Ross (author) (born 1971), advisor to Secretary of State Hillary Clinton
 Alec Ross (actor) (1922–1971), actor and first husband of Sheila Hancock
 Alec Ross (tour guide) (1936–2017), Australian tour guide
 Alec Ross (footballer) (1902–1985), Scottish footballer for Dundee, Arbroath and Rochdale

See also
Alexander Ross (disambiguation)
Alex Ross (disambiguation)